Junichi Arai (1932 - 25 September 2017) was a Japanese textile designer.

References

Textile designers

Japanese designers

1932 births

2017 deaths
Date of birth missing